Bordeta is a genus of moths in the family Geometridae.

Species
 Bordeta quadriplagiata Walker, [1865]

References
 Bordeta at Markku Savela's Lepidoptera and Some Other Life Forms
Natural History Museum Lepidoptera genus database

Ennominae